Thymidine kinase from herpesvirus  is a sub-family of thymidine kinases.

Its presence in herpesvirus-infected cells is used to activate a range of antivirals against herpes infection, and thus specifically target the therapy towards infected cells only.

Such antivirals include:

Purine analogues of guanine: Aciclovir, Famciclovir, Ganciclovir, Penciclovir, Valaciclovir, Valganciclovir 
Vidarabine
Pyrimidine analogues of uridine: Idoxuridine, Trifluridine
Brivudine
Mutations in the gene coding thymidine kinase in herpes viruses can endow the virus with resistance to aciclovir. In these situations, alternative medications that are of use include other guanine analogues such as famciclovir, valaciclovir and penciclovir.

References

Protein families
Viral enzymes